The 1996-97 West Coast Hockey League season was the second season of the West Coast Hockey League, a North American minor professional league. Six teams participated in the regular season, and the San Diego Gulls were the league champions.

Regular season

Taylor Cup-Playoffs

External links
 Season 1996/97 on hockeydb.com

West Coast Hockey League seasons
WCHL
1996–97 in Russian ice hockey